Halliday or Haliday is a surname. Notable people with the surname include:

Alexander Henry Haliday (1807–1870), Irish entomologist
Andrew Halliday (journalist) (1830–1877), British journalist and dramatist
Andrew Halliday (physician) (1782–1839), Scottish physician, reformer, and writer
Andy Halliday (born 1991), Scottish footballer
Billy Halliday (1906 – after 1933), Scottish footballer
Brad Halliday (born 1995), English professional footballer
Brett Halliday (1904–1977), pen name of American mystery author Davis Dresser
Bruce Halliday (footballer)
Bryant Haliday (1928–1996), American actor
Charles Haliday (1789–1866), Irish historian and antiquary
Dave Halliday (1901–1970), Scottish footballer
David Halliday (physicist) (1916–2010), American physicist and textbook author
Denis Halliday (born c. 1941), former United Nations Humanitarian Co-ordinator in Iraq
Ebby Halliday (1911-2015), American realtor
Edward Halliday (1902–1994), British painter
Eugene Halliday (1911–1987), artist, philosopher and spiritual teacher
F. E. Halliday (1903–1982), English academic and author
Fred Halliday (1946–2010), Middle East scholar
Fred Halliday (footballer) (1880-1953), English footballer
Frederick James Halliday (1806–1901), first lieutenant-governor of Bengal
Harry Halliday (cricketer, born 1920) (1920–1967), English cricketer
Harry Halliday (cricketer, born 1855) (1855–1922), New Zealand cricketer
Henry Halliday (1945-2022) Paediatrician and neonatologist
Jack Halliday (1926–2000), American football player
James Halliday (Canadian politician) (1845–1921), in the Canadian House of Commons from 1901 to 1904
James Halliday (weightlifter) (1918–2007), British weightlifter
James Halliday (wine) (born 1938), Australian wine critic and writer
Jimmy Halliday (1927–2013), leader of the Scottish National Party (1956–1960)
John Halliday (actor) (1880–1947), American actor
John Halliday (ophthalmologist) (1871–1946), Australian doctor
Johnny Hallyday  (1943-2017), French singer
Jon Halliday, Irish historian and co-author of the book Mao: the Unknown Story
Lin Halliday (1936–2000), American saxophonist
Matt Halliday (born 1979), New Zealand race car driver
Mark Halliday (born 1949), American poet
Martin Halliday (1926–2008), British neurophysiologist
Michael Halliday (1925–2018), linguist
Michael Halliday (footballer) (born 1979), footballer from Northern Ireland
Simon Halliday (Suffolk cricketer) (born 1958), English cricketer
Simon Halliday (born 1960), English rugby union player and cricketer
Tommy Halliday (born 1940), Scottish football player
Toni Halliday (born 1964), English vocalist, lyricist and occasional guitarist of the band Curve
William Reginald Halliday (1886–1966), historian and archaeologist

See also
Halladay
Hallyday
Andrew Smith Hallidie (1836–1900), promoter of San Francisco's first cable car system and California bridge builder

English-language surnames
Lists of people by surname